Kazhakam is a 1996 Indian Malayalam film directed by M. P. Sukumaran Nair and starring Nedumudi Venu and Urvashi in the lead roles.

Plot
Radha is a village girl living close to the temple with her ill mother. Radha is not married as both her father and brother were dead which destabilised her mother's mental health. Her house accommodates the pilgrims to the temple. Nedumudi Venu and Mullanezhi are the temple workers and close friends of Radha. Radha makes flower chains for the lord at the temple. She makes a living by selling milk. A newly appointed teacher, Nandini Kukku Parameshwaran comes to the village. As there are no other safe and comfortable lodging available, Nandini stays at Radha's house. Nandini has a baby son, Kannan. When Nandini goes to work, Radha takes care of Kannan. This develops unbreakable bond between Radha and Kannan. Soon, Nandini found out that she is pregnant with her second child, by the time, Radha became almost a mother to Kannan, loving and caring him more than his biological mother.

Nandini and Kannan once goes to their hometown and Radha sees a nightmare during this time. This nightmare visibly upsets Radha. Once Nandini and Kannan come back, Kannan falls sick. Though treated by the village vaidyar the boy doesn't get better. Radha takes the lead and gets the boy to the hospital. A fully pregnant Nandini gets admitted in the next ward leaving Radha alone with Kannan. Radha sees Kannan dying. 

The incident damages Radha's mental health. She decides to do nithyabhali and this is questioned by her friends as Kannan was only a guest in Radha's home. To which Radha responds that it was the God himself. 

Radha after performing the rituals foe Kannan takes a dip at the pond and doesn't reappear.

Cast
Urvashi as Radha 
 Nedumudi Venu as Aashaan 
 Ravi Vallathol as Chandran Pillai
Mullanezhi	as Thirumeni 	
 Kukku Parameswaran as Nandhini,Chandran Pillai's wife	
 Meena Ganesh as Women at the hospital 
 Valsala Menon as Radha's mother 
 Mukundan as Manikkuttan

Awards
Kerala State Film Award
Best Film
 Best Actress- Urvashi

References

External links

1996 films
1990s Malayalam-language films